Wendy Cluff (born August 7, 1951) is an American gymnast. She competed in six events at the 1968 Summer Olympics.

References

External links
 

1951 births
Living people
American female artistic gymnasts
Olympic gymnasts of the United States
Gymnasts at the 1968 Summer Olympics
Gymnasts from Los Angeles
20th-century American women